Carole Grandjean (born 18 May 1983) is a French politician of La République En Marche! (LREM) who has been serving as Minister for Education and Vocational Training in the government of Prime Minister Élisabeth Borne since 2022. From the 2017 elections to 2022, she was a member of the French National Assembly, representing the department of Meurthe-et-Moselle.

Political career
In parliament, Grandjean served as member of the Committee on Social Affairs and the Committee on European Affairs. On the Committee on Social Affairs, she was her parliamentary group's co-rapporteur on the government's pension reform plans since 2020, alongside Guillaume Gouffier-Cha, Jacques Maire and Corinne Vignon.

In addition to her committee assignments, Grandjean was a member of the French-British Parliamentary Friendship Group. From 2019, she was also a member of the French delegation to the Franco-German Parliamentary Assembly.

Political positions
In 2018, Grandjean joined other co-signatories around Sébastien Nadot in officially filing a request for a commission of inquiry into the legality of French weapons sales to the Saudi-led coalition fighting in Yemen, days before an official visit of Saudi Crown Prince Mohammed bin Salman to Paris.

In July 2019, Grandjean voted in favor of the French ratification of the European Union’s Comprehensive Economic and Trade Agreement (CETA) with Canada.

See also
 2017 French legislative election

References

1983 births
Living people
Deputies of the 15th National Assembly of the French Fifth Republic
La République En Marche! politicians
21st-century French women politicians
People from Suresnes
Politicians from Île-de-France
Women members of the National Assembly (France)
Deputies of the 16th National Assembly of the French Fifth Republic
Members of the Borne government
Members of Parliament for Meurthe-et-Moselle